National Cheng Kung University (NCKU) is a public research university located in Tainan, Taiwan. The university is best known for engineering, computer science, medicine, and planning and design.

As a top university in Taiwan, NCKU has played a vital role in creating the Taiwan Miracle by helping Taiwan to transform from an agriculture-based society to an industrialized economy during the 1960s and 1970s, and further becoming one of the Four Asian Tigers. NCKU has been taking the top spot at the Global Views Monthly (遠見雜誌) Taiwan Graduate Employability Rankings for 6 consecutive years.

In 2005, NCKU was chosen by the Ministry of Education (Taiwan) as one of the seven universities in Taiwan for the Aim for the Top University Project, which is similar to Top Global University Project in Japan and Universities of Excellence in Germany. Starting from 2006, because of its academic performance and research potential, the Ministry of Education (Taiwan) has offered NCKU NT$1.7 billion annually for five consecutive years, which is the second highest amount received among the universities in the project.

NCKU is a founding member of Taiwan Comprehensive University System, a strategic alliance of four leading research universities in the Southern Taiwan. The university is also a member of AACSB and IEET, and the only member from Taiwan in the Worldwide Universities Network.

History 
National Cheng Kung University was originally established under Japanese colonial government in January 1931 as the Tainan Technical College. After the Japanese handover of Taiwan in October 1945, the school was renamed to Taiwan Provincial Tainan Junior College of Technology in March 1946, and then to Taiwan Provincial College of Engineering in October the same year.

When the government of the Republic of China moved to Taiwan in 1949, it was one of the three existing colleges in Taiwan. As the number of colleges expanded, it was upgraded to a provincial university in 1956 as Provincial Cheng Kung University, named after Koxinga, a Chinese military leader who drove the Dutch East India Company from Taiwan and founded the Kingdom of Tungning. In 1971, the university became a national university and was renamed to National Cheng Kung University.

Former Minister for Education Wu Jin served as the first president of the new National Cheng Kung University.

Campuses
NCKU is located in Tainan City, Taiwan. The main campus is situated across from the Tainan Railway Station, offering convenient transportation. NCKU has 11 campuses occupying a total of 187 hectares of land in the greater Tainan area, including the Cheng-Kung, Sheng-Li, Kuang-Fu, Cheng-Hsin, Tzu-Chiang, Ching-Yeh, Li-Hsing, Tung-Ning, Kuei-Jen An-Nan and Dou-Liu campuses, and some areas designated for dormitory use.

On January 12, 2011, the Y. S. Sun Green Building Research Center was inaugurated. It is the world's first green educational center as well as Taiwan's first zero carbon building. The -facility cost NT$30 million (US$4.41 million) to construct, far below the original NT$180 million budget. Natural ventilation, limited power usage, reduced window size, and energy efficient lighting all contribute to the building's carbon neutrality.

Organization 
NCKU comprises 9 colleges, 43 departments, and 39 institutes. NCKU is organized into 9 colleges, including Liberal Arts, Sciences, Management, Engineering, Electrical Engineering & Computer Science, Social Science, Planning & Design, Bioscience & Biotechnology and Medicine, each with its own faculties, departments, and institutes offering programs up to doctoral level. The university currently offers 42 undergraduate programs, 74 master's degree programs, 53 doctoral programs, and 17 master's degree programs for working professionals. While most courses are taught in Mandarin Chinese, many are offered in English.

International programs
NCKU has 401 cooperation agreements with 251 institutions and universities across the world. Student exchange agreements have been signed with 98 foreign partner universities including University of Southern California, Technical University of Munich, Leiden University, the University of New South Wales, Kyoto University, Seoul National University, National University of Singapore, etc.

In 2018, KU Leuven and IMEC reached dual degree agreement with NCKU. During the same year, NCKU and Purdue University signed the agreement of collaboration for international dual degree program and online courses. TU Darmstadt launched its liaison office in Asia at NCKU on May 21, 2019.

NCKU participates in the Taiwan International Graduate Program in Interdisciplinary Neuroscience of Academia Sinica, the national academy of Taiwan.

Rankings 

NCKU is generally considered to be a top tier university in Taiwan, along with National Taiwan University, National Tsing Hua University, and National Yang Ming Chiao Tung University. In 2021, the QS World University Rankings ranked NCKU 234th overall in the world, 42nd in Asia, and 3rd in the nation.

According to QS World University Rankings by Subject in 2020, NCKU ranked within the world's top 150 universities in the following fields: Civil and Structural Engineering, Electrical and Electronic Engineering, Mechanical Engineering, Computer Science and Information Systems, Chemical Engineering, Engineering and Technology, Materials Sciences, Architecture, Statistics and Operational Research, Art and Design, and Environmental Studies.

The Academic Ranking of World Universities (ARWU) ranked NCKU 76-100th in the engineering field in 2016 and 101-150th in computer science in 2015. In 2020, NCKU ranked 218th in the world according to CWTS Leiden Ranking. In 2021 U.S. News & World Report rankings, NCKU is the world's 635th best university.

According to the ESI database, NCKU has published 18,333 papers in the last ten years and has respectively ranked the 24th and the 51st in the list of world top 100 universities respectively in the engineering and computer science fields.

In 2014, the Embassy of Japan in Taiwan listed NCKU as one of the seven well-known Taiwanese universities.

List of presidents
  (January 1931 – August 1941)
 Sakuma Iwao; 佐久間巖 (August 1941 – March 1944)
 Shunsuke Suemitsu; 末光俊介 (March 1944 – October 1944)
 Saburo Kousuke; 甲婓三郎 (October 1944 – October 1945)
  (February 1946 – August 1951)
 Yeh Tung-tse (August 1951 – February 1952)
  (February 1952 – July 1957)
 Yen Cheng-hsing (August 1957 – December 1964)
  (January 1965 – July 1971)
  (August 1971 – July 1978)
  (August 1978 – July 1980)
 Hsia Han-min; 夏漢民 (August 1980 – July 1988)
 Ma Che-ju; 馬哲儒 (August 1988 – July 1994)
 Wu Jin (August 1994 – June 1996)
 Huang Ting-chia; 黃定加 (July 1996 – February 1997)
 Weng Cheng-yi; 翁政義 (February 1997 – May 2000)
 Weng Hung-shan; 翁鴻山 (May 2000 – January 2001)
 Kao Chiang; 高強 (February 2001 – January 2007)
 Michael M. C. Lai (February 2007 – January 2011)
 Hwung Hwung-hweng (February 2011 – January 2015)
 Su Huey-jen; 蘇慧貞 (February 2015 – January 2023)
 Meng-Ru Shen; 沈孟儒 (Since February 2023)

Notable alumni 

 Chang Chia-juch, Minister of Economic Affairs (2013–2014)
 Chen Hsiung-wen, Minister of Labor (2014–2016)
 Tze-Chiang Chen, IBM Fellow, Vice President of Science and Technology at Thomas J. Watson Research Center, IBM Research Division
 Cheng Nan-jung majored in engineering at NCKU for one year before changing his interest to humanities
 Ken P. Chong, Director of the Division of Mechanics and Materials at the U.S. National Science Foundation
 Chu Ching-wu, Superconductor Physicist, President of Taiwan Comprehensive University System
 Wei-Kan Chu (1962), professor of physics, University of Houston
 Fan Chih-ku, Administrative Deputy Minister of Transportation and Communications
 Hsu Hsin-ying, founder and Chairperson of Minkuotang
 C. Y. Lee directed the design of Taipei 101, the world's second tallest, fully inhabited skyscraper
 Wen Ho Lee, nuclear physicist accused of spying for the PRC against the United States
 Lee Wo-shih, Magistrate of Kinmen County (2009–2014)
 Lin Hsin-i, Chairman of the Industrial Technology Research Institute, President of China Motor Corporation
 Lin Yi-bing, Vice President of the Office of Research and Development at the National Chiao Tung University
 Chung Laung Liu, computer scientist
 Lung Ying-tai, Minister of Culture (2012–2014)
 Mao Chi-kuo, Premier of the Republic of China (2014–2016)
 Pai Hsien-yung majored in engineering at NCKU for one year before changing his interest to humanities
 Samuel C. C. Ting, Nobel Prize laureate, attended NCKU prior to moving back to the United States
 Wang Chien-shien, President of Control Yuan (2008–2014)
 Wu Po-hsiung, Mayor of Taipei (1988–1990) and Chairman of Kuomintang (2007–2009)
 Chen Liang-gee, Minister of Ministry of Science and Technology (Taiwan) (2016–Present) and Distinguished Professor, Department of Electrical Engineering, National Taiwan University

See also

 National Cheng Kung University Hospital
 Taiwan Comprehensive University System
 List of universities in Taiwan

Notes

References

External links

  
 University website for International students
 Three universities in central and southern Taiwan forge alliance

 
1931 establishments in Taiwan
Comprehensive universities in Taiwan
Educational institutions established in 1931
Universities and colleges in Tainan
Universities and colleges in Taiwan